Annalisa Ciampi is an Italian law professor and public official. In 2017, Ciampi served as United Nations Special Rapporteur on the Rights to Freedom of Peaceful Assembly and of Association.

Education
Ciampi received her Juris Doctor degree from the University of Florence and her Master of Laws (LLM) from Harvard Law School. Ciampi went on to receive a PhD in international law from the Sapienza University of Rome. Additionally, Ciampi was a Brendan Fellow at the Lautherpacht Centre for International Law in at the University of Cambridge.

Career 
Ciampi was a professor of international law at the University of Verona prior to her United Nations appointment. While at the University of Verona, Ciampi published an article on the impeachment proceedings against Sudanese president Omar al-Bashir in the Journal of International Criminal Justice. She was also a visiting professor of European human rights law at the Monash University Prato Centre. 

On 1 May 2017, Ciampi replaced Maina Kiai as United Nations Special Rapporteur on the Rights to Freedom of Peaceful Assembly and of Association, serving until 30 November 2017. This appointment made her the first Italian to serve as a special rapporteur since Maria Grazia Giammarinaro. She was succeeded in this position in 2018 by Clément Nyaletsossi Voule.

References

Italian women ambassadors
United Nations special rapporteurs
Harvard Law School alumni
University of Florence alumni
Sapienza University of Rome alumni
Year of birth missing (living people)
Living people

Academic staff of the University of Verona